is a 1964 Japanese drama film directed by Shirō Toyoda.

Cast
 Machiko Kyō
 Keiji Sada
 Eitarō Ozawa
 Akira Nagoya
 Miyuki Kuwano

Release
Sweet Sweat was released in Japan by Toho on 19 September 1964, shortly after the death of co-star Keiji Sada. It was released in the United States by Toho International with English subtitles in September 1965. This version had a 120 minute running time.

Awards
Kinema Junpo awarded Machiko Kyō as Best Actress and Yōko Mizuki for Best Screenplay for this film and Kwaidan. Kyō also won the award for Best Actress at the Mainichi Film Concours for her work in the film.

References

External links
 

1964 films
1964 drama films
Japanese drama films
Japanese black-and-white films
Films directed by Shirō Toyoda
Toho films
1960s Japanese films